Leptacanthus can be one of these two genera:

Leptacanthus Agassiz, 1837, a chimaeroid fossil fish genus 
Leptacanthus Nees, a synonym of the plant genus Strobilanthes.